Alex Wong is the name of:

Alex Wong (producer, musician) (born 1974), American singer-songwriter
Alex Wong, Malaysian musician who performs under the stage name SingleTrackMind